The 1989 Atlantic 10 men's basketball tournament was played from March 4 to March 6, 1989, and March 9, 1989, at the Palestra in Philadelphia, Pennsylvania, except for the final that was played at Louis Brown Athletic Center in Piscataway, New Jersey.  The winner was named champion of the Atlantic 10 Conference and received an automatic bid to the 1989 NCAA Men's Division I Basketball Tournament. Rutgers University won the tournament. West Virginia University also received a bid to the NCAA Tournament.

Format
All ten conference members participated, with the top six teams in the conference received first-round byes. Seeds were based on regular season conference record.

Bracket

* - Overtime

References

Atlantic 10 men's basketball tournament
Tournament
Atlantic 10 men's basketball tournament
Atlantic 10 men's basketball tournament